Forest Field Aerodrome  is a small airport 10 nautical miles (18.5 km) to the northwest of Christchurch International Airport in Canterbury, New Zealand. The aerodrome is a privately operated airport.

Operational information 
No runway lighting
Runway strength ESWL 9,080
Circuit: All Runways – left hand 
Circuit Height: 1,500 ft AMSL

Sources 
NZAIP Volume 4 AD
New Zealand AIP (PDF)

Transport in Canterbury, New Zealand
Airports in New Zealand
Transport buildings and structures in Canterbury, New Zealand